Jed Prouty (born Clarence Gordon Prouty; April 6, 1879 – May 10, 1956) was an American film actor.

Biography

Born as Clarence Gordon Prouty in Boston, Massachusetts, Prouty was a vaudeville performer before becoming a film actor. Mostly appearing in comedies, he occasionally performed a serious character role, for instance a small part as an oily publicist in A Star is Born (1937). After a significant career in silent films, a large part of Prouty's later career was the Jones Family film series. They were 17 low-budget 20th Century Fox family comedies between 1936 and 1940, along with Spring Byington as Mrs. Jones, for such directors as Malcolm St. Clair and Frank R. Strayer. Prouty appeared in all but the final entry.

Partial filmography
(Films marked with a caret are Jones Family films)

 Her Game (1919)
 Sadie Love (1919)
 The Conquest of Canaan (1921)
 The Great Adventure (1921)
 Experience (1921)
 Room and Board''' (1921)
 Kick In (1922)
 The Girl of the Golden West (1923)
 The Knockout (1925)
 The Coast of Folly (1925)
 The Unguarded Hour (1925)
 Her Second Chance (1926)
 Ella Cinders (1926)
 Bred in Old Kentucky (1926)
 Miss Nobody (1926)
 Don Juan's Three Nights (1926)
 The Mystery Club (1926)
 Unknown Treasures (1926)
 Orchids and Ermine (1927)
 Domestic Meddlers (1928)
 Name the Woman (1928)
 Sonny Boy (1929)
 The Broadway Melody (1929)
 His Captive Woman (1929)
 Two Weeks Off (1929)
 The Fall of Eve (1929)
 The Devil's Holiday (1930)
 Paid (1930)
 Strangers May Kiss (1931)
 Annabelle's Affairs (1931)
 The Age for Love (1931)
 Business and Pleasure (1932)
 Manhattan Tower (1932)
 Skyway (1933)
 Music in the Air (1934)
 Murder on the Blackboard (1934)
 Every Saturday Night (1936) ^
 Educating Father (1936) ^
 Back to Nature (1936) ^
 The Texas Rangers (1936)
 Can This Be Dixie? (1936)
 Small Town Boy (1937)
 Off to the Races (1937) ^
 The Jones Family in Big Business (1937) ^
 One Hundred Men and a Girl (1937)
 Hot Water (1937) ^
 Borrowing Trouble (1937) ^
 Love on a Budget (1938) ^
 A Trip to Paris (1938) ^
 Safety in Number (1938) ^
 Danger on the Air (1938)
 Down on the Farm (1938) ^
 Goodbye Broadway (1938)
 The Duke of West Point (1938)
 Hollywood Cavalcade (1939)
 Exile Express (1939)
 Everybody's Baby (1939) ^
 The Jones Family in Hollywood (1939) ^
 Quick Millions (1939) ^
 To Busy too Work (1939) ^ 
 Young as You Feel (1940) ^
 Remedy for Riches (1940)
 Pot o' Gold (1941)
 Father Steps Out (1941)
 Roar of the Press (1941)
 The Affairs of Jimmy Valentine (1942) 
 Obliging Young Lady (1942)
 Guilty Bystander'' (1950)

References

External links 

 
 

1879 births
1956 deaths
American male film actors
American male silent film actors
Male actors from Boston
Vaudeville performers
20th-century American male actors